Ono no Kunikata (小野国堅) was a Japanese noble and waka poet in the Nara period.

Biography 
The details of the life of Ono no Kunikata are largely unknown. He was likely a member of the Ono clan. In Tenpyō 2 (730) he participated in a plum blossom-viewing party at the residence of Ōtomo no Tabito, then the governor (一大宰帥 ichi Dazai no sochi) of the Dazaifu. He was probably an officer of the Dazaifu.

Shakyō-shi  records from the Tenpyō 10s (25 January 738 – 3 February 747 in the Julian calendar) indicate that he was of the upper  .

Poetry 
Poem 844 in the Man'yōshū is attributed to him.

See also 
 Reiwa

References

Citations

Works cited 

 
 
 

8th-century Japanese poets
Man'yō poets
Japanese male poets
Ono clan